Mirza Mu'hammad Zahir ud-Din Shah (1855–1899) known as Mirza Zahir Shah (Persian-ظهیرالدّین  میرزا محمد
) was a Mughal descendant and an Indian nobleman in the erstwhile British Empire who was the first Zamindar of Natore and patriarch of the House of Singra and Natore.

Early life

Born in 1855 as the oldest son of Mirza Jalal Shah, a political pensioner, in Allahabad, after the events of 1857. He was a grandson of Mirza Jahan Shah (1795-1846) and was named after an ancestor, Mirza Zahiruddin Muhammad Babur, the first Mughal Emperor (1483-1530). Many members of the formerly ruling families were exiled eastwards towards Bengal such as the family of Tipu Sultan and Wajid Ali Shah, the rulers of Mysore and Awadh. The Delhi Imperial family was exiled eastwards to Burma. Calcutta in Bengal became the capital of the Indian Empire in 1858, himself reaching there before 1868 and serving the Maharajas of Natore in Natore.

Background
He was given land grants by the British administrators as a lord (Zamindar) of the villages in East Bengal and served as the "Mridha" or the Minister to the Maharaja of Rajshahi under who he was subinfeudated. With the decline of the Natore Zamindari, he received areas and villages formerly under the Hindu ruling family.

Death and legacy
In the early 1870s, in neighboring estates in Natore, he provided support to the local governors and zamindars in crushing the Pabna revolts by the peasantry. In Pabna, he was a patron and participant in the Chalanbeel Horse Races. After his death in 1899, the estates of the family was expanded by his son and grandsons to become one of the few Muslim zamindars in the area. After the abolition of the lord-peasant system in 1950, members of the family held important positions in the regional politics and local governance.

His son Mirza Zafar succeeded him as the Zamindar. His office of the Mridha went to younger sons who dominated politics in Rajshahi and Natore well into the twenty first century, such as Ibrahim Ali Mridha and others.

Sources
 

1855 births
1899 deaths
Mughal nobility